Serena Jameka Williams (born September 26, 1981) is an American inactive professional tennis player. Considered among the greatest tennis players of all time, she was ranked world No. 1 in singles by the Women's Tennis Association (WTA) for 319 weeks, including a joint-record 186 consecutive weeks, and finished as the year-end No. 1 five times. She won 23 Grand Slam singles titles, the most by any player in the Open Era, and the second-most of all time. She is the only player, male or female, to accomplish a Career Golden Slam in both singles and doubles.

Along with her older sister Venus, Serena Williams was coached by her parents Oracene Price and Richard Williams. Turning professional in 1995, she won her first major singles title at the 1999 US Open. From the 2002 French Open to the 2003 Australian Open, she was dominant, winning all four major singles titles (each time over Venus in the final) to achieve a non-calendar year Grand Slam and the career Grand Slam, known as the 'Serena Slam'. The next few years saw her claim two more singles majors, but suffer from injury and decline in form. Beginning in 2007, however, she gradually returned to form despite continued injuries, retaking the world No. 1 singles ranking. Beginning at the 2012 Wimbledon Championships, Williams returned to dominance, claiming Olympic gold (completing the Career Golden Slam in singles) and winning eight out of thirteen singles majors, including all four in a row from 2014–15 to achieve a second "Serena Slam". At the 2017 Australian Open, she won her 23rd major singles title, surpassing Steffi Graf's Open Era record. She then took a break from professional tennis after becoming pregnant and reached four major finals upon returning to play. In August 2022, Williams announced her impending "evolution" away from professional tennis and played what was expected to be her final match at the 2022 US Open. 

Williams also won 14 major women's doubles titles, all with her sister Venus, and the pair was unbeaten in major doubles finals (the best unbeaten record in major finals in any discipline of the sport). The pair achieved a non-calendar year Grand Slam between the 2009 Wimbledon Championships and the 2010 French Open, which granted the sisters the doubles world No. 1 ranking. Serena won four Olympic gold medals, three in women's doubles—an all-time joint record in tennis, shared with her sister. The duo are the only women in the Open Era to win Olympic gold in both singles and doubles. She also won two major mixed doubles titles, both in 1998. She is the only singles player, male or female, to complete three Career Golden Slams – one in women's singles and two in same-sex doubles.

The arrival of the Williams sisters has been credited with ushering in a new era of power and athleticism on the women's professional tennis tour. Serena holds a combined 39 major titles: 23 in singles, 14 in women's doubles, and two in mixed doubles. She is joint-third on the all-time list and second in the Open Era for total major titles. She is the most recent woman to simultaneously hold all four major singles titles (2002–03 and 2014–15), and the most recent woman to win the Surface Slam (major titles on hard, clay and grass courts in the same calendar year), doing so in 2015. She is also, with Venus, the most recent player to have simultaneously held all four major women's doubles titles (2009–10).

Williams was the world's highest paid woman athlete in 2016, earning almost $29 million. She repeated this feat in 2017 when she was the only woman on Forbes list of the 100 highest-paid athletes, with $27million in prize money and endorsements. She won the Laureus Sportswoman of the Year award a record four times (2003, 2010, 2016, 2018), and in December 2015 was named Sportsperson of the Year by Sports Illustrated magazine. She is the highest-earning woman athlete of all time.

Early life
Williams was born on September 26, 1981, in Saginaw, Michigan to Oracene Price and Richard Williams. She is the youngest of Price's five daughters: half-sisters Yetunde, Lyndrea, and Isha Price, and full older sister Venus. She also has at least seven paternal half-siblings. When the children were young, the family moved to Compton, California, where she started playing tennis at age four. Her father home-schooled her and her sister, Venus. While he and subsequently her mother have been their official coaches, her other mentors have included Richard Williams, a Compton man who shared her father's name and subsequently founded The Venus and Serena Williams Tennis Tutorial Academy.

When Williams was nine, she and her family moved from Compton to West Palm Beach, Florida so she could attend the tennis academy of Rick Macci, who provided her with additional coaching. Macci did not always agree with Williams's father, but respected that "he treated his daughters like kids, allowed them to be little girls". Richard stopped sending his daughters to national junior tennis tournaments when Williams was 10, as he wanted them to "go slowly" and focus on school work. Experiences of racism also influenced this decision, as he had heard white parents talk about the Williams sisters in a derogatory manner during tournaments. At that time, Williams had a 46–3 record on the United States Tennis Association junior tour and was ranked number one among under-10 players in Florida. In 1995, when Williams was in the ninth grade, her father pulled his daughters out of Macci's academy and took over all coaching at their home. When asked in 2000 whether it would have been more beneficial for them to have followed the normal path of playing regularly on the junior circuit, Williams responded, "Everyone does different things. I think for Venus and I, we just attempted a different road, and it worked for us."

Professional career

1995–1998: Professional debut
Williams' parents wanted their daughter to wait until she was 16 to participate in professional tournaments. In 1995, just after turning 14, Williams planned to make her professional debut as a wild-card entry in the Bank of the West Classic in Oakland, California, but was denied by the WTA owing to their age-eligibility restrictions. She subsequently filed an antitrust lawsuit against the women's tour, but withdrew it at her parents' request. Her first professional event was in October 1995 at the Bell Challenge in Quebec, where she used a wild-card entry to circumvent age-eligibility rules. She lost in the first qualifying round to then 18-year-old American Annie Miller, winning just two games.

Williams did not play a tournament in 1996. The next year, she lost in the qualifying rounds of three tournaments, before winning her first main-draw match in November at the Ameritech Cup Chicago. Ranked No. 304, she upset No. 7 Mary Pierce, and No. 4 Monica Seles, recording her first career wins over top10 players and becoming the lowest-ranked player in the Open Era to defeat two top-10 opponents in one tournament. She ultimately lost in the semifinals to No. 5 Lindsay Davenport. She finished 1997 ranked No. 99.

Williams began 1998 at the Medibank International Sydney. As a qualifier ranked No. 96, she defeated No. 3 Davenport in the quarterfinals, before losing to Arantxa Sánchez Vicario in the semifinals. Williams made her debut in the main draw of a Grand Slam tournament at the Australian Open, where she defeated sixth-seeded Irina Spîrlea in the first round, before losing to her sister, Venus, in the second round in the sisters' first professional match. She reached six other quarterfinals during the year, but lost all of them, including her first match against No. 1-ranked Martina Hingis at the Lipton International Players Championships in Key Biscayne, and her second match against Venus at the Italian Open in Rome. She failed to reach the quarterfinals of any Grand Slam tournament the remainder of the year, losing in the fourth round of the French Open to Arantxa Sánchez Vicario, and the third round of the US Open to Spîrlea. She withdrew from Wimbledon two games into a match with Virginia Ruano Pascual, after straining a calf muscle during the first set. She did win the mixed doubles titles at Wimbledon and the US Open with Max Mirnyi, completing the Williams family's sweep of the 1998 mixed doubles Grand Slam tournaments. She won her first professional title in doubles at the U.S. National Indoor Championships in Oklahoma City with Venus, becoming the third pair of sisters to win a WTA title. They won two more doubles titles that year. Williams finished the year ranked No. 20 in singles.

Battle of the sexes: Karsten Braasch vs. the Williams sisters

A 16-year-old Serena and her sister Venus competed in a tennis "Battle of the Sexes" against Karsten Braasch at the 1998 Australian Open. At the time Braasch was 203rd in the ATP rankings. The sisters had claimed they could beat any man outside the top 200, and accepted his challenge. Braasch beat both of them, playing one set against each. The score versus Serena was 6–1 and 6–2 against Venus. Braasch said afterward, "500 and above, no chance." The sisters later tweaked the number to beating men outside the top 350.

1999–2001: Becoming a top-10 player
Williams lost in the third round of the 1999 Australian Open to Sandrine Testud. A month later, Williams won her first professional singles title when she defeated Amélie Mauresmo in the final of the Open Gaz de France in Paris. With Venus also winning the IGA Superthrift Classic in Memphis, Tennessee, that day, the pair became the first sisters to win professional tournaments in the same week. In March of that year, at the Evert Cup in California, Williams won her first Tier I title, defeating Steffi Graf in the final. Soon afterward at the Miami Masters, Williams had her 16-match winning streak ended by her sister in the first all-sister singles final in WTA history, and she then made her top-10 debut, at No. 9. She then lost in the quarterfinals of the Italian Open and the German Open, and the third round of the French Open, where she and Venus won the women's doubles title. Williams then missed Wimbledon because of injury. When she returned to the tour, Williams won a Fed Cup singles match and then won the JPMorgan Chase Open in Los Angeles, beating Julie Halard-Decugis in the final. She then defeated in succession Grand Slam champions Kim Clijsters, Conchita Martínez, Monica Seles, and defending champion Lindsay Davenport to reach the US Open final, where she defeated No. 1, Hingis, to become the second African-American woman, after Althea Gibson in 1958, to win a Grand Slam singles tournament. The Williams sisters also won the doubles title at this tournament. To complete her 1999 season, Williams won a doubles match in the Fed Cup final against Russia. Williams ended the year ranked No. 4 in just her second full year on the main tour.

Williams started 2000 by losing in the fourth round of the Australian Open to Elena Likhovtseva. She failed to defend her titles in Paris and Indian Wells, although she did win the Faber Grand Prix in Germany. Soon afterwards, Williams missed the French Open because of injury. She returned from injury at the Wimbledon Championships, where she lost to Venus in the semifinals, but the pair won the doubles title at the event. Williams successfully defended her title in Los Angeles, defeating Davenport in the final. She reached the final of the Du Maurier Open where an injury forced her to retire from her match with Hingis. Her defense of the US Open title ended when she lost in the quarterfinals to Davenport. Williams teamed with Venus to win the gold medal in doubles at the Sydney Olympics that September. She ended the year winning the Toyota Princess Cup in Japan and she finished the year ranked No. 6.

Williams began 2001 losing to Martina Hingis in the quarterfinals of the Medibank International in Sydney and the Australian Open in Melbourne. Williams and her sister won the doubles title at the latter tournament, becoming only the fifth doubles team in history to win all four Grand Slam women's doubles titles during their career, completing a "Career Grand Slam". Her next event was the Pacific Life Open in California, where she defeated Kim Clijsters in the final. The final was marred by the behavior of the crowd toward Williams and her family. Crowd members were incensed at the perceived match-fixing of games involving the family after Venus withdrew before their semifinal. Neither Williams nor her sister entered the tournament for fourteen years until Williams entered in 2015 as a wildcard (and the top seed). The following week at the Ericsson Open in Miami, Williams lost to Jennifer Capriati in the quarterfinals. She then lost in the quarterfinals to Capriati at both the French Open and Wimbledon Championships. That was the fourth consecutive Grand Slam tournament at which Williams had exited in the quarterfinals. During the North American hard-court season, she lost in the quarterfinals of Los Angeles against Monica Seles, then captured her second title of the year at the Rogers Cup, defeating Capriati in the final. Williams reached the final of the 2001 US Open, losing to sister Venus. That was the first Grand Slam tournament final contested by two sisters during the Open Era. At the 2001 season-ending Tour Championships, Williams won the championship by walkover when Davenport withdrew before the start of the final because of a knee injury. Williams finished 2001 at No. 6 for the second straight year.

2002–2003: "Serena Slam"
Early 2002, injury saw Williams retire from the semifinal at the Medibank International Sydney and later withdraw from the Australian Open. 

Returning from injury, Williams won her first title of the year in Scottsdale, Arizona, defeating No. 2 Jennifer Capriati, in the final. She then won the Miami Masters for the first time, becoming one of three players in the Open Era to defeat the world's top 3 ranked players at one tournament, after beating No. 3, Martina Hingis, in the quarterfinals, No. 2 Venus in the semifinals, and the top-ranked player, Capriati, in the final. Serena's straight set win over Venus was her second career win over her sister.

Williams played three clay-court tournaments before the 2002 French Open. Her first tournament was at Charleston, where she was the third seed. Williams reached the quarterfinals before losing to Patty Schnyder. She reached her first clay-court final in May, at the Eurocard German Open losing to Justine Henin in a third set tiebreak. Williams went on to win her first clay court title at the Italian Open, defeating Capriati in the semifinals and Henin in the final. This raised her ranking to a new high of No. 3. Williams was the third seed at the French Open at Roland Garros, where she claimed her first title thereby defeating defending champion Capriati in the semifinals and sister Venus in the final to win her second Grand Slam tournament title (and her first in two-and-a-half years). As a result of raising the trophy at Court Philippe Chatrier, Williams rose to a career-high of No. 2, second only to Venus.

At the 2002 Wimbledon Championships, Williams won tennis's oldest championship for the first time in her life, defeating Venus to win a Grand Slam singles title without dropping a set for the first time in her career. This victory earned Williams the world No. 1 ranking for the first time, dethroning her sister and becoming only the third African American woman to hold that ranking. The Williams sisters also won the doubles title at the tournament, the fifth Grand Slam doubles title for the pair. Williams played just one tournament between Wimbledon and the US Open, losing in the quarterfinals of the JPMorgan Chase Open in Los Angeles to American Chanda Rubin and ending a 21-match winning streak. The top-seeded player at the US Open, Williams reached the final where, for the third Grand Slam in a row, she defeated her sister to win the title, the second US Open crown of her career. Williams won two consecutive singles titles in the fall, defeating Kim Clijsters to win the Toyota Princess Cup in Tokyo, and Anastasia Myskina to win the Sparkassen Cup in Leipzig, Germany. She reached the final at the year-end Home Depot Championships at the Staples Center in Los Angeles, where she lost to fifth-seeded Clijsters in straight sets, ending an 18-match winning streak.

Williams finished 2002 with a 56–5 W/L record, eight singles titles, and the No. 1 ranking. She was the first African-American to end a year with that ranking since Althea Gibson in 1958  and was the first woman to win three Grand Slam tournament titles in one year since Hingis in 1997. Her three consecutive Grand Slam titles to close 2002 also made Williams only the third player in tennis history to win the "Surface Slam", three Slam titles on three surfaces in the same calendar year, after Navratilova (1984) and Graf (1993, 1995, 1996).

At the 2003 Australian Open, Williams reached the tournament's semifinals for the first time, where she recovered from 5–1 down in the third set and saved two match points before defeating Clijsters. In the final, Serena faced Venus for the fourth consecutive Grand Slam tournament final, defeating her older sister to become the sixth woman in the Open Era to complete a career Grand Slam, alongside Margaret Court, Billie Jean King, Chris Evert, Martina Navratilova, and Steffi Graf. She also became the fifth woman to hold all Grand Slam singles titles simultaneously, joining Maureen Connolly Brinker, Court, Graf, and Navratilova. This feat was dubbed the "Serena Slam" by the press. The Williams sisters won their sixth Grand Slam doubles title together at this event.

During the spring of 2003, Williams captured the singles titles at the Open Gaz de France and the Sony Ericsson Open. Williams's winning streak came to an end when she lost the final of the Family Circle Cup to Henin, her first loss of the year after 21 wins. She also lost to Mauresmo in the semifinals of the Internazionali BNL d'Italia in Rome. Despite these losses, Williams was the top seed at the French Open, where she lost in the semifinals to eventual champion Henin, marking Williams's first loss in a Grand Slam tournament since 2001. The match was controversial, as Williams questioned Henin's sportsmanship, and spectators applauded Williams's errors. Williams rebounded from the French Open loss a couple weeks later at the 2003 Wimbledon Championships, defeating Henin in the semifinals and Venus in the final. This was Williams's second consecutive Wimbledon title and her sixth Grand Slam singles title overall. Wimbledon was Williams's last tournament of 2003; she pulled out of three events in the US and then underwent surgery on the quadriceps tendon in her knee in early August. Williams was initially expected to be out for six to eight weeks.

2004–2007: Injuries and the comeback

After eight months away from the tour, during which time her desire was questioned, Williams began her comeback at the 2004 NASDAQ-100 Open in Miami in March, where she made a triumphant return as she won the title for the third consecutive year.

Although ranked No. 7, Williams was seeded second at the French Open, where, after winning four matches, she lost to Capriati in the quarterfinals. That was the first time that Williams had lost before the semifinals at a Grand Slam singles tournament since Wimbledon in 2001. A few weeks later, even though her ranking had dropped to No. 10, Williams was seeded first at Wimbledon. She won six matches en route to the final, where 13th-seeded Maria Sharapova defeated her in straight sets. This loss caused her ranking to drop out of the top 10 for the first time since 1999. Later that summer, Williams reached her third final of the year at the JPMorgan Chase Open in Los Angeles where she lost to Lindsay Davenport which was her first loss to the American since the 2000 US Open. After missing her national championship in 2003, Williams returned for the 2004 US Open, where she was seeded third despite her No. 11 ranking. She lost in the U.S. Open quarterfinals to Capriati in three sets in controversial fashion. That fall, Williams won her second title of the year, at the China Open, defeating US Open champion Svetlana Kuznetsova in the final. Williams's successful season allowed her to qualify for the Tour Championships, held again in Los Angeles. In the round-robin phase of the tournament, Williams defeated Dementieva and Anastasia Myskina and lost to Davenport, but still advanced to the elimination stage. After winning her semifinal, she lost to Sharapova in the final, where she suffered an abdominal injury. Williams finished 2004 ranked No. 7, but did not win a Grand Slam singles tournament for the first season since 2001.

At the 2005 Australian Open, Williams rejected suggestions that she and sister Venus were a declining force in tennis, following Venus's early exit. Williams saved three match points to defeat Sharapova 8–6 in the third of their semifinal. In the final, Williams defeated top seed Davenport to win her second Australian Open and seventh Grand Slam singles title, winning 12 of the last 15 games. The win moved Williams back to No. 2 but stated she was targeting the top spot.

Williams completed just two tournaments between the Australian Open and Wimbledon, losing to Venus in Miami and at Internazionali BNL d'Italia to Francesca Schiavone as Williams suffered a series of retirements and withdraws. A reoccurring ankle injury causing her to miss the French Open. She returned for Wimbledon as the 4th-seeded player, but was defeated in the third round by No. 85, Jill Craybas. At the US Open, Williams lost to her sister Venus in the fourth round. This was the earliest the sisters had met in a Grand Slam tournament since their first meeting, at the 1998 Australian Open. Williams played just one more match that fall, a loss to No. 127 Sun Tiantian at the tournament in Beijing. She failed to qualify for the year-end championship for the first time since 1998 and she finished the year 2005 ranked No. 11, her first time finishing the season outside the top 10 since 1998.

Williams made her 2006 debut at the Australian Open. Defending the title, Williams lost to Daniela Hantuchová in the third round. After the tournament, she told the press that she was injured, blaming a lack of fitness and a knee injury for keeping her off the court. In her biography, Williams claims that she was actually suffering from depression. She stayed away from pro tennis for six months during the 2006 season. After she had shut herself off from the world for a period, Williams saw a therapist daily. After a chance meeting with a young girl who idolized Williams and believed that she could still win, Williams signed up to play in Cincinnati, her first tournament since Melbourne. Williams had slipped to No. 139, the lowest ranking she had held since 1997. On her return, Williams defeated Myskina and Bethanie Mattek, before losing in the semifinals to Vera Zvonareva. She also reached the semifinals in Los Angeles, losing to Janković in straight sets. At the US Open, Williams needed a wildcard to enter the tournament, as her ranking at the cut-off time was No. 139, outside the automatic 102. Her ranking had improved to 79th by the time the tournament came around. She lost to top-seeded Mauresmo in the fourth round. Following the US Open, she did not play again in 2006, ending the year ranked No. 95, her lowest year-end ranking since 1997.

Williams began 2007 with renewed confidence, stating her intention to return to the top of the rankings, a comment 1987 Wimbledon men's singles champion and commentator Pat Cash branded "deluded".

Williams lost in the quarterfinals of the Hobart International, a warm-up for the Australian Open where Williams was unseeded because of her No. 81 ranking and was widely regarded as "out of shape". She experienced a huge amount of pressure on herself before the tournament, coming from her fans and the press as well as Williams herself about her weight, focus and needing a good showing.

Shortly before her first match, a representative from Nike paid her a visit in the players' lounge, informing her that if she did not perform to her accustomed level, the company might drop her. Williams claimed that Nike's ultimatum meant that she would have to reach the quarterfinals at least.

The distraction from Nike did not distract Williams, as she lost just three games to Mara Santangelo and defeated Anne Kremer in straight sets. By this point, a blister had developed on Williams's foot and she had contracted a cold. In the third round, Williams found herself two points away from going home against Nadia Petrova, but fought back to win in three sets, which was her first win over a top-10 player since defeating Lindsay Davenport in the 2005 Australian Open final. Williams then made it to the final, defeating Janković, Pe'er and Vaidišová. Williams described them as "good players. Strong players. Players who certainly didn't expect an overweight, out-of-shape, has been champion like me to give them a game." Williams also found herself two points from going out against Peer before turning it around. By the time Williams had reached the final, the cold and blister had both left. Previewing the finals, Tracy Austin stated that, although Williams had a great tournament, she believed that the ride was over and that Sharapova would have no trouble with Williams. Williams thought it was mean and unnecessary and used it as motivation along with other criticism. In the final, Williams lost just three games against Maria Sharapova, winning her first title at any tournament since winning the 2005 Australian Open 24 months prior. Williams became the first player since Chris O'Neil to win the title while not being seeded, and claimed her third Australian Open and eighth Grand Slam singles title overall. The win elevated Williams to 14th in the rankings. Williams dedicated the title to her deceased half-sister Yetunde. Her performance in the final was described in the press as "one of the best performances of her career" and "arguably the most powerful display ever seen in women's tennis". In her post-match interview, Williams took a swipe at her critics, stating that she had proved them wrong. Williams won the Sony Ericsson Open in Miami for the fourth time by defeating Justine Henin. Williams had to record a come-from-behind win after being whitewashed in the first set and saving two match points in the second. She played for her country in the Fed Cup for the first time since 2003 in a tie against Belgium, and won her opening match but withdrew from her second, because of a knee injury.

At the French Open, Williams lost in the quarterfinals to Henin. During her fourth round match against Hantuchová at Wimbledon, Williams collapsed from an acute muscle spasm at 5–5 in the second set. After a medical timeout and holding serve to force a tiebreak, rain forced play to be suspended for nearly two hours. When the players returned, Williams won the match in three sets. Williams then lost her quarterfinal match with Henin, whilst suffering from the injuries sustained in the previous round. At the US Open, Williams lost her third consecutive Grand Slam singles quarterfinal to Henin. Williams reached the final of Kremlin Cup, losing to Elena Dementieva. Williams qualified for the WTA Championships, but retired from her first match with Anna Chakvetadze with a knee injury and subsequently withdrew from the event. Williams finished 2007 as No. 7 and the top-ranked American for the first time since 2003.

2008–2010: Back to No. 1 and injuries

Williams started 2008 by participating on the U.S. team that won the Hopman Cup with Mardy Fish. At the Australian Open she lost in the quarterfinals to Jelena Janković, her fourth straight loss in the quarterfinals of a Grand Slam singles tournament. In the women's doubles event, she and Venus were defeated in the quarterfinals. Williams withdrew from her next three scheduled tournaments because of an urgent need for dental surgery. Williams then won three consecutive singles titles at Bangalore and her fifth Miami title, tying Steffi Graf for the most singles titles at this tournament.

Williams won at the Family Circle Cup, her first clay-court title since the 2002 French Open. Her 17-match winning streak was ended by Dinara Safina in the quarterfinals of Berlin. Williams withdrew in Rome in the quarterfinals against Alizé Cornet owing to a back injury. Williams was the only former winner of the French Open in the draw, but lost in the third round to Katarina Srebotnik.

At Wimbledon, Williams reached the finals for the first time in four years but lost to her older sister Venus in straight sets, in their first Slam final since 2003. Serena and Venus teamed to win the women's doubles title in their first Grand Slam women's doubles title since 2003. Williams played at Stanford, but retired 6–2, 3–1 down with a left knee injury from her semifinal match against qualifier Aleksandra Wozniak. The injury forced her to withdraw from Los Angeles. At the Olympics in Beijing, Williams lost to Dementieva in the quarterfinals. Serena and Venus won the gold medal in doubles, beating Anabel Medina Garrigues and Virginia Ruano Pascual in the final. At the US Open, Williams defeated sister Venus, Safina and Jelena Janković in the final. That was her third US Open and ninth Grand Slam singles title. The victory returned her to the No. 1 ranking for the first time since 2003. At the year-end championships she defeated Safina and lost to Venus in her round-robin matches, but withdrew from her match against Dementieva, citing a stomach muscle injury. She ended 2008 ranked No. 2 and with four singles titles, her strongest performance in both respects since 2003.

Williams began 2009 at the Medibank International, losing in the semifinals to Elena Dementieva. At the Australian Open, she claimed her tenth Grand Slam singles title by defeating Dinara Safina in the final in 59 minutes. This win returned her to the No. 1 ranking and resulted in her becoming the all-time career prize money leader in women's sports, overtaking golfer Annika Sörenstam. In women's doubles, with Venus, they captured the title for the third time.

At the Open GdF Suez, Williams withdrew before her semifinal match against Dementieva because of a knee injury. Serena then played at Dubai, losing to Venus in the semifinals.

At the Sony Ericsson Open Williams, hampered with ankle and quad injuries, was upset in the final by Victoria Azarenka. This was the first of four consecutive losses for her, the longest losing streak of her career. She was defeated in her opening matches at Barcelona, Rome, and Madrid. Despite not having won a match on clay in 2009 before the French Open, she lost in the quarterfinals to the eventual champion Svetlana Kuznetsova. This ended her 18-match Grand Slam tournament winning streak. She rebounded at Wimbledon, saving a match point in defeating fourth seeded Dementieva in the semifinals. In the final, Serena defeated her sister Venus to win her third Wimbledon title and her 11th Grand Slam singles title. Serena and Venus teamed to win the women's doubles title at Wimbledon for the second consecutive year, their ninth Grand Slam title in women's doubles.

As a US Open preparation, Williams played at Cincinnati losing in the third round, followed by a semifinal defeat at the Rogers Cup. At the US Open, she lost in the semifinals to eventual champion Kim Clijsters amid controversy involving shouting at a line judge when defending match point, an offense which cost Williams the point and consequently the match. She continued in the doubles competition, teaming up with Venus to win their third Grand Slam doubles title of the year and tenth of their career. Williams won all three of her round-robin matches at the year-end WTA Tour Championships, defeating Venus, Dementieva, and Kuznetsova, saving a match point against Venus. She then advanced to the final, when Wozniacki retired from their semifinal match. In the final, Williams defeated Venus for her second singles title at this event.  Williams finished the year ranked No. 1 for the second time in her career, having played in 16 tournaments, more than any other year. She also broke the record previously set by Justine Henin for the most prize money earned by a female tennis player in one year, with Williams earning $6,545,586. For doubles that year, the Williams sisters finished the year ranked No. 2, despite playing only six tournaments together as a pair. Williams had won five Grand Slam tournament titles, putting her total of Grand Slam titles won thus far at 23, and she was consequently named Female Athlete of the Year by the Associated Press for 2009. Williams was also the ITF World Champion in both the singles and doubles events.

In 2010, Williams's first scheduled tournament was in Sydney, losing in the final to Elena Dementieva. At the Australian Open, Williams was the defending champion in both singles and doubles. She reached the final and defeated Justine Henin, who had just recently come out of retirement, for her twelfth Grand Slam singles title. In doubles, Williams and her sister, Venus, successfully defended their title by defeating Cara Black and Liezel Huber in the final.

Williams withdrew with a leg injury from her next few events, and returned at the Rome Masters, losing to Jelena Janković in the semifinals. At Madrid, she fell to Nadia Petrova in the third round but partnered Venus to win the doubles title.

At the French Open, Williams was defeated by Samantha Stosur in the quarterfinals. She and Venus were the top seeds in the doubles event and won the title, defeating Květa Peschke and Katarina Srebotnik in the final to win their fourth consecutive Grand Slam doubles title and improving their doubles ranking to No. 1.

Williams's next tournament was Wimbledon, where she defeated Russian Vera Zvonareva in the final without facing a break point and breaking the serve of Zvonareva three times. She did not lose a set in the tournament.

After the match, Martina Navratilova said that Williams is in the top five of all the women's tennis players in all of history, which she said that "it's not just about how many Slams you win or how many tournaments you win—it's just your game overall. And she's got all the goods." Serena was the defending champion in doubles with her sister Venus, winning the last two years. They lost in the quarterfinals to Elena Vesnina and Zvonareva. In Munich on July 7, Williams stepped on broken glass while in a restaurant, and the injury caused her to miss the rest of the year.

Williams ended the year ranked No. 4 in singles after six tournaments, and No. 11 in doubles after four tournaments.

On March 2, 2011, she confirmed that she had suffered a hematoma and a pulmonary embolism.

2011–2013: Return to dominance, career golden slam

Williams finally made a return to the practice court in March 2011. She made her first appearance on the WTA tour in almost a year in Eastbourne. Williams lost in round two to Vera Zvonareva in a match that lasted over three hours. Her next tournament was Wimbledon, where she was the defending champion. She reached the round of 16, where she lost to Marion Bartoli. After the loss, her ranking dropped to 169. Williams won her first titles since her return to tennis triumphing in Stanford and Toronto. At the Western & Southern Open, Williams defeated Lucie Hradecká, only to withdraw the next day, citing a right toe injury. She then played at the US Open going all the way to the final and losing to Samantha Stosur during a match which featured her verbally abusing the chair umpire. The US Open final turned out to be Williams's last match in 2011, and she ended the year ranked No. 12 with two titles and with a 22–3 record for the season. She only participated in six tournaments throughout the season.

Williams started the 2012 season at the Brisbane International, however, during her match against Bojana Jovanovski, she injured her left ankle when serving for the match. As a result, Williams was forced to withdraw from the tournament. Next she participated at the Australian Open where she was upset by Ekaterina Makarova in the fourth round. After a month layoff, Williams returned to competition in Miami losing in the quarterfinals to Caroline Wozniacki. Williams then won consecutive titles at Charleston and Madrid beating Lucie Šafářová and Victoria Azarenka, but withdrew from her semifinal match against Li Na in Rome citing a lower back injury. Williams suffered her first ever loss in the opening round of a Grand Slam tournament at the French Open against Virginie Razzano. Williams notched up a 33–1 record for the second half of the season winning five titles in the process. Williams won her fifth Wimbledon singles title, her fourteenth Grand Slam title; setting a serving record of 24 aces by a woman in a match as well as having the most aces, male or female, during the tournament (102). Williams returned to America to successfully defend her title in Stanford beating CoCo Vandeweghe in the final. Williams then returned to Wimbledon to represent her country at the Olympic Games where she won gold, defeating Maria Sharapova in a dominating performance. Williams failed to drop more than three games per set en route to winning the medal. Williams undefeated streak ended with a loss in Cincinnati to Angelique Kerber. In New York City, Williams went on to win her fourth US Open singles title and her 15th career Grand Slam title overall beating Azarenka in the final. Williams ended the season by competing at the WTA Championships and went undefeated throughout the tournament to win the event for her third title. Williams was voted WTA Player of the Year for the fourth time. Based on her brilliant show in 2012, Williams was also named International Tennis Federation World Champion. Williams also returned to doubles competitions with Venus; in the pair's first tournament since 2010 Wimbledon, they claimed their fifth Wimbledon doubles title and the 13th grand slam doubles title. The pair successfully defended their Olympic doubles title which meant that they became the only tennis players to win four gold medals.

Williams's first tournament of the 2013 season was in Brisbane, where she won the title without dropping a set. Williams was upset in the quarterfinals of the Australian Open by fellow American player Sloane Stephens. By virtue of defeating Petra Kvitová in Doha, Williams returned to the No. 1 position for the sixth time in her career and became the oldest woman in the Open Era to hold the ranking. Williams went on to lose to Victoria Azarenka in the final. In the Miami final, Williams lost a set to Maria Sharapova for the first time since 2008. This setback did not stop Williams who recorded her 70th come-from-behind win. The win made Williams a six-time champion in Miami breaking the record she held with Steffi Graf and became only the fourth woman in the Open Era to have won a tournament at least six times. Williams successfully defended her Charleston title, winning it for the third time overall. Williams won her fiftieth career singles title in Madrid, defeating Sharapova in the final. Williams then played Rome, where she won the title without dropping a set, defeating Victoria Azarenka in the final to take her second title. Williams only dropped ten games in reaching the quarterfinals at Roland Garros. There, she played Svetlana Kuznetsova and lost her first set of the tournament. In the semifinal, Williams only lost one game when she defeated Sara Errani, something seven-time French Open champion Chris Evert described as the finest woman performance on clay she had ever seen. Williams defeated Sharapova to claim her second Roland Garros title, her sixteenth grand slam tournament title overall. She became the fourth woman in the Open Era after Navratilova, Evert and Graf to win each Grand Slam tournament title on at least two occasions. At Wimbledon, she advanced easily to the fourth round before being upset by eventual finalist Sabine Lisicki in three sets. After Wimbledon, Williams won the Swedish Open by defeating Johanna Larsson in the final, the tournament win marked the first occasion that she had won an International level title. By winning the tournament this meant that Williams had managed to be undefeated on clay during the season.

Williams won her 3rd Rogers Cup title in Toronto beating Sorana Cîrstea in the final. Williams reached the final of the Western & Southern Open for the first time but lost to Azarenka. At the US Open, Williams began as top seed and defending champion. She reached the final—a rematch of the 2012 final against Azarenka—and won in three sets, capturing her 17th Grand Slam singles title. Williams became the oldest US Open champion in the Open Era and pushed her career prize money past $50million. After the US Open, Williams beat Jelena Janković to win the China Open in Beijing for her 10th title of 2013. Williams went through the WTA Championships undefeated winning the final against Li Na, to become the first person to defend the title since Justine Henin in 2007. Williams won her 11th title of 2013 becoming the 8th player to win 11 titles or more in a year and the first since Martina Hingis in 1997. Also, she became the oldest person to win the WTA Championships and 4th player to win it 4 times or more. By winning the championship, Williams became the first woman to win more than $10million in a season and with her total of $12,385,572, only Rafael Nadal, in 2013, and Novak Djokovic, in 2011, 2012 and 2013, have earned more money in one season.

Williams finished as the year end No. 1 for the third time, becoming the oldest No. 1 player in WTA history. She was also named the 2013 ITF World Champion, the fourth time that she received the World Champion's crown. Williams received two prizes at the 2013 ESPY Awards. Williams won Best Female Athlete and Best Female Tennis Player. Williams is just the fourth person to win Best Female Athlete on two occasions and she won Best Female Tennis player for a record sixth time. In late December 2013, Williams capped off her year by receiving the Associated Press 2013 Female Athlete of the Year award, her third AP award after 2002 and 2009. Only two women, Chris Evert and Babe Didrikson, have been chosen more often as AP Athlete of the Year since the annual awards were first handed out in 1931.

2014–2015: Second 'Serena Slam'

Williams defended her title at the Brisbane International by defeating No. 2, Victoria Azarenka, in the final. At the Australian Open she ended up losing to former No. 1, Ana Ivanovic, in the fourth round. At Dubai, Williams lost her semifinal match to Alizé Cornet in straight sets. Williams next headed to the Miami Open where she won her record seventh title with a straight-sets victory over No. 2 Li Na. Williams lost to Jana Čepelová in the second round of the Family Circle Cup. She made it to the quarterfinals at the Madrid Open before withdrawing with a left thigh injury. Williams won her third title of the season at the Rome. She was then handed the worst loss of her Grand Slam tournament career by Garbiñe Muguruza at the second round of the French Open, who defeated Serena losing just four games in two sets. Alizé Cornet defeated Williams for the second time in the year in the third round of Wimbledon, thus handing Williams her earliest Wimbledon exit since 2005. Serena was then forced to withdraw from the doubles event alongside sister Venus while trailing 0–3 in the second round. A disoriented Serena hit 4 consecutive doubles faults and was having trouble with both her ball toss and movement before being removed from what has been described as one of the most unusual scenes ever seen in tennis.

Williams rebounded by winning 19 out of her next 20 matches (losing only to sister Venus in the semifinals of the Rogers Cup). This streak include titles at the Bank of the West Classic as well as her first Western & Southern Open title and her third consecutive and sixth overall US Open singles title which she won without having dropped a set. With this victory Williams tied Chris Evert for most singles titles won by a woman at the US Open in the Open Era. Williams also tied Evert and Navratilova's 18 Grand Slam singles titles won in the Open Era. By virtue of having won both the US Open and the US Open Series, Williams collected $4,000,000 – the biggest payday in tennis history. At the Wuhan Open a viral illness forced her to retire while up a break in the first set against Alizé Cornet. Cornet thus became the first woman since Justine Henin in 2007 to record three victories over Williams in one year. At the China Open Williams retired prior to her quarterfinal match versus Samantha Stosur. At the 2014 WTA Finals in Singapore Williams advanced to the final for the third consecutive year despite having equaled her career-worst loss in her second round robin match versus Simona Halep. Williams won her fifth WTA Finals title by avenging her loss to Halep in the championship match for her seventh title of the year. Williams finished the year ranked No. 1 for the fourth time in her career. She held the No. 1 ranking for the entire calendar year, a feat not accomplished since Steffi Graf in 1996. She was also voted WTA Player of the Year and ITF World Champion for a third consecutive year (sixth overall).

Williams began the 2015 season by representing the United States alongside John Isner at the Hopman Cup. The American pair lost the final to the Poland. At the Australian Open Williams defeated Maria Sharapova for the 16th consecutive time to claim her 6th Australian Open singles title and 19th career Grand Slam singles title, winning the title on her third match point in the second set. With this victory Williams surpassed both, Evert and Navratilova, for second most Grand Slam singles titles won in the Open Era. The title was also her sixth Grand Slam singles title since turning 30 years of age, three more than the next closest to do so (Margaret Court, Martina Navratilova with three each). She is the only player in history to win all four Grand Slams at least once after having turned 30. The following weekend, Serena and sister Venus traveled to Buenos Aires to face Argentina in a World Group II tie for Fed Cup. She played and won her only match against María Irigoyen to help Team USA to a 4–1 win over Argentina. Williams announced that she would be competing at the Indian Wells Masters ending her 14-year boycott of the event. Upon her return Williams received a standing ovation from the crowd and won her first match in straight sets. She reached the semifinals, where she was due to face No. 3, Simona Halep, for a place in the final, but was forced to withdraw because of a knee injury. By virtue of having defeated Sabine Lisicki in the quarterfinals of the Miami Open, Williams became only the eighth woman in the Open Era to record 700 match wins in her career. This also made her one of only three active players to have won 700 or more matches in singles, others being Roger Federer and Rafael Nadal. In the semifinals she won against Halep to advance to her tenth final at the event where she won a record eighth title and extended her winning streak to 21 by beating Carla Suárez Navarro.

As preparation for the clay court season (and to ensure her eligibility for the 2016 Summer Olympics), Williams travelled to Brindisi, Italy, to face Italy's team for a place in the Fed Cup's World Group. Williams lost the decisive doubles match alongside Alison Riske to Sara Errani and Flavia Pennetta, and as a result the United States team were relegated to World Group II. It was Williams's first loss in the Fed Cup. She maintained her perfect record in singles by defeating Camila Giorgi and Errani. The week of April 20 marked Williams's 114th consecutive week ranked No. 1, the third-longest run in WTA history, behind Steffi Graf's 186 weeks and Navratilova's 156. Williams suffered her first defeat of the season in the semifinals of the Mutua Madrid Open to No. 4, Petra Kvitová. This loss ended a 27-match winning streak for Williams as well as a 50-match winning streak at Premier-Mandatory events, and also a 19-match winning streak at the particular event. Williams played one match at the 2015 Internazionali BNL d'Italia before withdrawing from the tournament with an elbow injury.

By virtue of having defeated Victoria Azarenka in the third round of the French Open, Williams became the first woman in the Open Era to win 50 matches at all four of the Grand Slams. Williams then defeated Sloane Stephens to reach her 40th Grand Slam singles quarterfinal. Williams won her next match easily, but had to come back from a set down in the semifinals versus Timea Bacsinszky for the fourth time in five matches to reach the final. She would go on to defeat Lucie Šafářová from the Czech Republic in three sets to win her third French Open and 20th Grand Slam singles title.

The win made Williams only the third person in history to win each Grand Slam at least three times, joining Margaret Court and Steffi Graf. She is the first player to win three straight Grand Slams since she did it herself during the Serena Slam. She also became the first player to win the Australian-French Open double since Jennifer Capriati in 2001.

Williams completed her second "Serena Slam" (winning all four Grand Slams in a row) by winning the 2015 Wimbledon Championships – her 6th Wimbledon and 21st Grand Slam singles title overall. Her path to victory at Wimbledon was particularly challenging. She was down a double break in the third round versus Heather Watson and two points from defeat twice before rallying for the win and becoming the first player to qualify for the WTA Finals (the earliest that a player had qualified since the event switched to the round-robin format in 2003). Williams then defeated three former No. 1 players–Venus Williams, Victoria Azarenka and Maria Sharapova—in succession to advance to the final. Awaiting her there was 21-year-old Garbiñe Muguruza, who had previously handed Williams the worst Grand Slam tournament defeat of her career at the 2014 French Open. Williams defeated Muguruza in a tight two-setter.

The victory made Williams the oldest woman in the Open Era to win a grand slam singles title, in addition to having the distinction of being the oldest ladies' grand slam singles champion of all time. It also was her eighth consecutive victory in Grand Slam singles finals appearances, breaking Steffi Graf's Open Era record of seven from 1995 through 1999 and, on the men's side, tying Pete Sampras's Open Era record of eight from 1995 through 2000. Her 21st Grand Slam singles titles equaled the tally of the rest of the women's tour, combined. The week of July 13 marked the first time in WTA history that the No. 1 player had more than twice as many points as No. 2. Following her win at Wimbledon, Williams was awarded her 7th ESPY for Best Female Tennis Player.

Williams played one match at the Swedish Open in Båstad before withdrawing with an elbow injury. She was the defending champion at the Bank of the West Classic but withdrew from the tournament in order for her elbow to get better. Williams had her 19 match winning streak ended by 18-year-old Swiss Belinda Bencic, the No. 20, in three tight sets in the semifinals of the Canadian Open. It was her second defeat of the year and first on hard courts since the 2014 WTA Finals. The next week Williams defended her title at the Western & Southern Open with a straight sets victory over No. 3 Simona Halep for her 69th WTA title, breaking a tie with Evonne Goolagong for standalone fifth-most WTA titles won. Williams's attempt at capturing the "Grand Slam" (winning all four Grand Slams in a calendar year) came to an end in the semifinals of the US Open, where she lost to Roberta Vinci in three sets. The loss has been described by some as one of the biggest upsets in tennis history. Nonetheless, Williams secured the year-end No. 1 ranking with her results at the tournament. On October 1, Williams called an end to her season, stating that she had been injured for most of the year and wanted to address her fitness issues. Prior to the announcement, coach Patrick Mouratoglou hinted that Williams might not play again in 2015 owing to a lack of motivation and disappointment following her loss at the Open. On October 5, Williams surpassed Chris Evert for third-most weeks ranked world No. 1. Williams held the No. 1 ranking the entire season for the second consecutive year, finishing there for the fifth time in her career. She was voted WTA Player of the Year for the seventh time in her career. On December 14, Sports Illustrated announced Williams as their Sportsperson of the Year. She thus became the third solo woman, and first since 1983, to receive the award. Williams was also named ITF World Champion for the sixth time in her career. Soon after, it was announced that she was voted Female Athlete of the Year by the Associated Press for the fourth time.

2016: Open Era Grand Slam record

Williams withdrew from the Hopman Cup after retiring from her singles match against Australia Gold with inflammation of her left knee. Her next tournament was the Australian Open, where she was the No. 1 seed and defending champion. She reached the final without dropping a set, including wins over No. 5, Maria Sharapova, and No. 4, Agnieszka Radwańska, and faced first time Grand Slam finalist Angelique Kerber. She was considered the heavy favorite to win the title, as she had never lost an Australian Open final or semifinal. She also dominated the head-to-head against Kerber, having lost only once in six meetings and having not lost a set to her in four years. Williams lost the final in three sets and Kerber won her first Grand Slam title. This marked Williams's first-ever loss in the final of the Australian Open, as well as her first three-set loss in the final of a Grand Slam. She had previously been 6–0 and 8–0 respectively.

The week of February 15 marked Williams's 157th consecutive week ranked No. 1, passing Navratilova's mark of 156 to have the second-longest run in WTA history behind Steffi Graf's 186. She competed in Indian Wells as the No. 1 seed. She reached her first final here since winning in 2001 and before boycotting the event, by defeating Simona Halep in the quarterfinals and Agnieszka Radwańska in the semifinals. She did not drop a set en route to the final. Williams was upset by No. 13 seed Victoria Azarenka, whom she had defeated the last five times the pair had met, in straight sets. This marked the first time since 2004 where Williams lost two consecutive finals. She next played the Miami Open as the defending champion. She lost in the fourth round to Svetlana Kuznetsova. This marked her first loss here since 2012 and ended her 20 match winning streak in Miami. This was also her earliest exit here since 2000, where she lost in the same round. During the clay court swing, Williams withdrew from Madrid but entered Rome. She beat Anna-Lena Friedsam and Christina McHale to progress to the quarterfinals where she defeated Svetlana Kuznetsova to avenge her loss in Miami. She then went on to beat Irina-Camelia Begu and Madison Keys to win her 70th career WTA title and to win her first title of the year. This was her third Rome title in four years and fourth overall.

At the French Open, Williams dropped only one set en route to the final. She defeated Yulia Putintseva in the quarterfinals despite being five points away from losing. She then beat surprise semifinalist Kiki Bertens to reach her fourth French Open final where she faced Garbiñe Muguruza in a repeat of last year's Wimbledon final where Williams was victorious. The result was not the same as that Wimbledon final as Williams lost to Muguruza in straight sets. With this loss, Williams had lost two consecutive Grand Slam finals for the first time in her career. On top of failing to equal Steffi Graf's Open Era record of 22 Grand Slam singles titles, Williams also completed the Career Grand Slam runner-up set with this loss.

At Wimbledon, Williams only lost one set en route to the final where she faced Angelique Kerber in a rematch of their Australian Open final earlier in the year. This time, Williams defeated Kerber in straight sets to finally equal Steffi Graf's record of 22 Grand Slams in the Open Era. That was Williams's first Grand Slam title of the year, as well as her 71st career WTA title overall. In what was a brilliant serving performance, Williams only faced one break point in the whole match against Kerber which she saved with an ace. Later that day, Williams partnered with sister Venus to win their sixth Wimbledon doubles title and 14th doubles Grand Slam title overall, keeping their perfect record at Grand Slam doubles finals intact. On July 24, 2016, Williams withdrew from Rogers Cup citing a shoulder inflammation injury. She next participated in the Olympics in Rio de Janeiro, where she was the defending gold medalist in both singles and doubles and was the heavy favourite to retain those titles. Partnering with her sister Venus in the doubles, they suffered a shock exit in the first round, losing to the Czech duo of Lucie Šafářová and Barbora Strýcová, which ended their career record of 15–0 dating back to the 2000 Olympics. In singles, after defeating Daria Gavrilova and Alizé Cornet in the first two rounds, Williams faced Ukraine's Elina Svitolina in the third round in what was a rematch of this year's French Open fourth round, but lost to the Ukrainian, bringing an end to her Olympics campaign. Days after the Olympics, Williams took a late wildcard for the Western & Southern Open, where she was the defending champion, but then decided to withdraw owing to concerns from the same shoulder injury/inflammation from earlier in the summer.

The week of September 5, 2016, marked Williams's 186th consecutive week ranked No. 1, equalling Steffi Graf's record for longest run in WTA history. In the semifinals of the US Open, Williams lost to Karolína Plíšková. Having won the US Open, Angelique Kerber became the No. 1, ending Williams's No. 1 streak. Williams also pulled out of the WTA Finals because of a shoulder injury.

2017: Australian Open victory and pregnancy

Williams started her 2017 season by participating in the WTA Auckland Open for the first time in her career. She defeated Pauline Parmentier to win her first match since the US Open. In the second round, she lost to Madison Brengle. At the Australian Open, she beat former and present top 10 players Belinda Bencic, Lucie Šafářová, Johanna Konta among others to reach her 8th Australian Open final. On January 28, 2017, she won the Australian Open for an Open Era record seventh time, defeating her sister, Venus. It was her 23rd Grand Slam singles title, surpassing Steffi Graf's Open Era record of 22. It was the first time in the Open Era that two players aged 35 or older had competed in the final of a Grand Slam tournament. The win ensured her return to the No. 1 ranking. Williams subsequently withdrew from the Indian Wells and Miami Opens, citing a knee injury.

On April 19, 2017, Williams revealed that she was 20 weeks pregnant and would miss the remainder of the season. The timing of her announcement led to the conclusion that she would have been roughly eight to nine weeks pregnant when she won the Australian Open. In interviews, she said that she intended to return to tennis after her pregnancy, saying that she had an "outrageous plan" of competing in the 2018 Australian Open.

On September 1, 2017, Williams gave birth to a daughter. She had a cesarean-section delivery due to a pulmonary embolism during labor. She suffered another pulmonary embolism after giving birth, leaving her bedridden for six weeks and delaying her return to training.

On December 30, 2017, Williams played her first match since giving birth, an exhibition match at the World Tennis Championship in Abu Dhabi, losing to reigning French Open champion Jeļena Ostapenko.

2018: Return to tennis, Wimbledon and US Open runner up 
On January 5, 2018, Williams withdrew from the upcoming Australian Open, citing a lack of sufficient preparation in the wake of her pregnancy. In February, after overcoming her pregnancy-induced health problems, she returned to the tennis court with her sister. The pair lost to Lesley Kerkhove and Demi Schuurs (Netherlands) in the Fed Cup's first round on February 11. Despite saying she was 100% ready to come back to tennis, Williams suffered back to back early exits at Indian Wells and Miami, losing in the third round at Indian Wells to her sister Venus and the first round at Miami to 2018 Indian Wells champion Naomi Osaka.

Williams made her return to Grand Slam tennis at the 2018 French Open, playing singles and doubles with her sister Venus. In the first round, she defeated Kristýna Plíšková in two tight sets and later 17th seed Ashleigh Barty in the second round. Then, she defeated 11th seed Julia Görges to set up a fourth-round match against 28th seed Maria Sharapova, whom she had beaten 18 consecutive times since 2004. Williams withdrew owing to an injury to her pectoral muscle sustained in a third-round match in doubles where she and Venus were defeated by Andreja Klepač and María José Martínez Sánchez.

In July, Williams entered the Wimbledon Championships and was controversially seeded #25. With a world ranking at the time of 181, many felt that the decision showed bias and favored Williams unduly. Others argued that the All England Club, who do not base their seedings on players' current world rankings – as other grand slam tournaments do– had sensibly considered Williams's excellent historic record there. Williams herself said: "I was pleasantly surprised. I came in here expecting that maybe I wouldn't get a seed." Her seeding resulted in Dominika Cibulková losing her place to be seeded.

By the second week of the tournament, for the first time in grand slam history, none of the top ten seeded women players had made it to the quarterfinals. En route to the quarterfinals, Williams had beaten Arantxa Rus of Holland in round one, Viktoriya Tomova of Bulgaria in round 2, Kristina Mladenovic of France in round 3 and Evgeniya Rodina of Russia in round 4. She had not lost a set in any of her matches till then. Williams then beat Italian Camila Giorgi in the quarterfinals after losing one set, and became the lowest ranked player to ever reach the Wimbledon semifinals. She met 13th seed Julia Görges of Germany in the semifinal and beat her comfortably in two sets to reach her tenth Wimbledon final, the first since giving birth. She lost in the final in straight sets to Angelique Kerber of Germany in a rematch of the 2016 Wimbledon final.

Following her Wimbledon finals run, Williams entered the 2018 Silicon Valley Classic, her first appearance in a US Open series tournament since 2015. She recorded her most lopsided loss in her career to Johanna Konta in the first round, winning just a single game. Williams later revealed in an interview with Time that she checked Instagram ten minutes prior to the match starting, and found out that the man who had fatally shot her half-sister, Yetunde, in 2003 was released on parole earlier in the year. She said in the interview, "I couldn't shake it out of my mind."

Williams's next tournament was the Cincinnati Masters. She beat Daria Gavrilova of Australia in straight sets in the first round, but lost to Petra Kvitová in the second round in a three-set match that lasted over two hours. Her next tournament was the 2018 US Open in Flushing Meadows, New York, where she was seeded 17th, although ranked 26th in the WTA ranking at the time seeds were determined. She defeated Magda Linette in the first round, Carina Witthöft in the second round, her sister and 16th seed Venus in the third round, Kaia Kanepi in the fourth round, and 8th seed Karolína Plíšková in the quarterfinals. The match against Plíšková was a rematch of the 2016 US Open semifinal, which Plíšková had won. This was Williams's first win against a player in the top 10 (at the time of the match) since her return from pregnancy. Williams won her semifinal match against 19th seed Anastasija Sevastova of Latvia, winning a spot in the women's singles final against Naomi Osaka of Japan which she lost in straight sets. Williams was warned for illegal coaching, penalized a point for breaking her racket, and then penalized a game for verbal abuse of the chair umpire.

2019: Return to the top 10, injuries, Wimbledon and US Open runner-up
Williams started her 2019 season at the Australian Open, having not made an appearance at the tournament since winning the 2017 edition. Seeded 16th, she defeated Tatjana Maria, Eugenie Bouchard, and Dayana Yastremska in the first three rounds, before defeating top seed and world number one Simona Halep in the fourth. In the quarterfinals, she met 7th seed Karolína Plíšková. Plíšková won the first set and lead in the second, but Williams took control of the match, winning the second and rapidly taking a huge lead in the third. However, after Williams twisted her ankle while up match point, Plíšková won six consecutive games, saving four match points throughout the set to win the match. This was Williams's earliest defeat at the Australian Open since her fourth-round loss in 2014, and broke a streak of fourteen consecutive match wins in Grand Slam quarterfinals (having last lost a Grand Slam quarterfinal at the 2013 Australian Open). Despite this loss, her ranking climbed up to number 11.

Williams went on to defeat Victoria Azarenka in the second round of the Indian Wells Masters in her 2019 campaign for a third Indian Wells crown. In the third round, viral illness caused her to retire against Spain's Garbiñe Muguruza. This was the second consecutive year she had exited at this stage. She then sustained a recurrence of a long-term knee injury which caused her to pull out of Miami and Rome after playing one match. She could not train properly until after the French Open, where she lost in the third round. At Wimbledon, Williams reached a major final for the 13th consecutive year. She also became the oldest grand slam finalist in the open era. She lost the final to Simona Halep in two straight sets in under an hour.

At the Canadian Open, Williams defeated Naomi Osaka in straight sets in the quarterfinals and Czech qualifier Marie Bouzkova in three sets in the semi finals. Against Canadian teenager Bianca Andreescu, she retired in the first set after 19 minutes. She told the chair umpire of her decision to retire because of back spasms. Her back problems continued at the Cincinnati Open, where she withdrew shortly before her first-round match, stating, "Unfortunately my back is still not right."

Williams was seeded eighth at the US Open. In the first round she met Maria Sharapova for the first time since the 2016 Australian Open, defeating her in straight sets, yielding just one game in each set. She defeated Caty McNally in three sets in the second round, and Karolína Muchová and Petra Martić in straight games in the third and fourth. In the quarterfinals she faced 18th seed Wang Qiang, who she overcame in just 45 minutes, yielding a single game. In the semifinals she defeated fifth seed Elina Svitolina, proceeding to the final where she faced 15th seed Bianca Andreescu for the second time in under a month. With Andreescu up a set and five games to one in the second set, Williams launched a spirited comeback to level the set at 5-games-all. However, Andreescu was able to hold serve and break Williams to win the title in straight sets. This was Williams's last match of the year which she ended ranked No. 10.

2020: First title since maternity leave
Top-seeded Williams won her first singles title as a mother at the 2020 ASB Classic, defeating Jessica Pegula in the final. She also reached the finals in the doubles tournament with Caroline Wozniacki; the pair were defeated by Asia Muhammad and Taylor Townsend. Hence, she became the first woman in the professional era with at least one title in four decades: the 1990s, 2000s, 2010s and 2020s.

Williams's next tournament was the 2020 Australian Open where she was seeded 8th. She defeated Anastasia Potapova and Tamara Zidanšek in the first and second rounds respectively in straight sets, before falling to Wang Qiang in three tight sets in the third round.

On the resumption of the WTA Tour following a pause caused by COVID-19, Williams entered the Top Seed Open as the top seed. Following a tough three-set win over Bernarda Pera in the first round, Williams faced her sister Venus for their 31st WTA match in the second round and came through after dropping the first set. Williams went on to suffer a shock defeat in the quarter finals to fellow American Shelby Rogers. At the Cincinnati Open, played in New York, Williams received a bye in the first round, beat Arantxa Rus in the second, and lost to Maria Sakkari in three sets in the third round.

Williams was seeded 3rd at the second major of the year, the 2020 US Open. After two straight sets victories to begin with, Williams faced former grand slam champion Sloane Stephens in the third round, winning in three sets. In the fourth round, Williams avenged her loss to Sakkari in the previous tournament. In the quarter-finals, she defeated Tsvetana Pironkova of Bulgaria who was playing in her first tournament in three years after giving birth. She thus advanced into the semifinals, where she faced Victoria Azarenka, losing in three sets. Her match with Azarenka marked the first time two mothers met in a Grand Slam semi-final. She also became the first player in history to reach the semifinals of Grand slam and US Open in four decades: the 1990s, 2000s, 2010s and 2020s.

Williams was seeded 6th at the delayed 2020 French Open held in cold and heavy conditions in October. After defeating Kristie Ahn in straight sets in the first round, Williams withdrew before her second round match against wildcard Tsvetana Pironkova, citing an achilles injury she had sustained during her semi-final defeat to Azarenka at the US Open. This meant for the first time since 2006, Serena failed to reach a Grand Slam final.

2021: Australian Open semifinal, out of top 40
Williams started the year by playing the Yarra Valley Classic, where she withdrew prior to her semifinal match against the top seed, Ashleigh Barty citing a right shoulder injury.

In the Australian Open Williams was seeded 10th and lost to the 4th seed, Naomi Osaka, in the semifinal after defeating 2nd seed, Simona Halep, and 7th seed, Aryna Sabalenka, along the way. Williams's match with Osaka was the first time the two had met in a major since the infamous 2018 US Open final. When leaving the court after losing to Osaka in the Australian Open, Williams paused to acknowledge the crowd longer than she usually would. In the press conference following the match, she faced questions about whether she was bidding farewell to tennis and retiring. She said "I don't know, if I ever say farewell, I wouldn't tell anyone."

In May, at the Italian Open, Serena Williams played her 1000th match of her career. She was defeated by Nadia Podoroska in the second round in straight sets.

On June 29, Williams would suffer an injury during the first set in the first round at Wimbledon against Belarusian player Aliaksandra Sasnovich, forcing her to withdraw from the competition.

In August 2021, a leg injury forced Williams to withdraw from 2021 US Open. Her withdrawal saw Williams plummet nineteen places to 41st in the world, her lowest year-end ranking in 15 years.

2022: King Richard promotion, Wimbledon and US Open, retirement 

In December 2021, Williams announced she would not play the 2022 Australian Open, citing the same leg injury. As of March 2022, she was ranked 241st.

She spent much of early 2022 promoting King Richard about her father with her sisters. She appeared at several award ceremonies including the 94th Academy Awards.

Williams returned to professional play in June 2022 when she partnered up with Ons Jabeur in the Eastbourne International. The pairing beat Sara Sorribes Tormo and Marie Bouzková in the first round, and Shuko Aoyama and Chan Hao-ching in the second. The pairing retired from the tournament afterwards owing to an injury sustained by Jabeur. Williams also entered the 2022 Wimbledon Championships in singles, having accepted a wildcard after dropping to 1204th in the singles rankings. She lost to Harmony Tan in the first round in an over 3 hour match, the longest thus far at the tournament.

In August, Williams wrote an article for Vogue, in which she announced her plans to 'evolve away' from tennis after the US Open, indicating retirement. Williams began her farwell tour by entering the 2022 Canadian Open using a protected ranking. She beat Nuria Párrizas Díaz in straight sets for her first singles win in 14 months, before losing to Belinda Bencic. Williams subsequently entered the 2022 Cincinnati Masters, in which she lost to reigning US Open champion Emma Raducanu in the first round.

Before the US Open, Williams announced she would play doubles with Venus for the first time since 2018. Their opening-round match marked the first time a first-round doubles match was held in the Arthur Ashe Stadium during television primetime. The sisters lost to the Czech duo of Lucie Hradecká and Linda Nosková.

In singles, Williams won her opening-round match against Danka Kovinić. In the second round, she upset world No. 2 Anett Kontaveit to become the oldest woman ever to defeat a top-three ranked player. She then played what was expected to be her final match against Ajla Tomljanović, losing in three hard-fought sets.

Transition from tennis 
In the September 2022 issue of Vogue, written in August, Williams announced that she was "evolving away from tennis, toward other things that are important to me". In her announcement she said that she disliked the word "retirement" and preferred the term "evolution".

She went on to cite growing her family, focusing on her venture capital firm, and spending more time with family as reasons she would be leaving the sport. While she did not set an exact time for her goodbye, she stated that she was not ready to win Wimbledon (where she lost in the first round), but would try to win in New York. She also said that she consulted Tiger Woods in her decision.

At her first match since the publication of the Vogue article, where she lost to Belinda Bencic in Toronto, tournament organizers interviewed Williams on-court after her match and gave her gifts to remember the city.

At her matches at the 2022 US Open, which many believed would be her last tournament, tournament directors played a video following her opponents' introduction but before Williams' walk-out. Some saw this as disrespectful to her opponents.

Following her first-round match, where Woods, Mike Tyson, Bill Clinton, Ruth Westheimer, Spike Lee, Vera Wang, and Eric Adams were in attendance, the tournament played a video narrated by Oprah Winfrey and had Gayle King facilitate the post-match on-court interview.

Following her announcement, many fellow players, including Naomi Osaka and Coco Gauff, praised Williams and said they would not be playing tennis if not for her.

Playing style
Williams is an aggressive baseliner, whose game is centered around her powerful serve and forceful groundstrokes. Owing to her high-risk playing style, she typically hits a large number of both winners and unforced errors. Williams' greatest asset is her serve, which is considered the greatest in the history of women's tennis. Her serve is known for its fast pace and accurate placement, allowing her to serve numerous aces: at the 2013 Australian Open, she served a 128.6 mph (207 km/h) ace in her third round match against Ayumi Morita, which is the third fastest serve recorded in WTA history. Williams possesses an accurate and consistent ball toss, allowing her to serve to any position on the court with minimal differences in the position of the ball in the air; this makes it difficult for opponents to read her service motion and predict the position of her serve, allowing her to dominate a rally from the first stroke. Williams also possesses effective and accurate kick and slice serves, which she deploys as second serves, minimising double faults, and preventing opponents from scoring free points.

Williams is also known for her forceful groundstrokes, which are considered two of the most powerful shots in the history of women's tennis. She hits both her forehand and her backhand in an open stance, allowing her to generate consistently powerful, heavy, and dominating groundstrokes, and to generate sharp, acute angles, which allow her to hit winners from any position on the court. Williams is known for her forehand, which has been described as "devastating". Her forehand is hit with heavy topspin; this allows her to dominate rallies, and she is capable of hitting her forehand both crosscourt and down the line to produce winners. Her two-handed backhand is equally dominant, and has been described as one of the greatest backhands of all time. Williams tends to hit her backhand flatter than her forehand, allowing her to hit her backhand with speed, power, and depth both crosscourt and down the line. Despite playing primarily from the baseline, Williams is an adept net player thanks to her extensive doubles experience, and will frequently choose to finish points at the net, either with deft touch, aggressive drive volleys, or a solid, powerful, and reliable overhead smash. Williams possesses an aggressive return of serve – she neutralises powerful first serves, and attacks weak second serves. She is widely considered one of the greatest return players of all time.

Despite predominantly employing an aggressive game style, she is also an excellent defender, and is capable of counterpunching against aggressive opponents until she creates an opportunity to hit a winner. She is an exceptional athlete, known for her movement, speed, court coverage, agility, flexibility, balance, and footwork. Her on-court intelligence, shot selection, and point construction allow her to execute her gamestyle effectively. She has been praised for her mental strength and competitive spirit, with her being described as one of the toughest opponents to beat on the court; Martina Navratilova declared her mental strength "unbelievable", whilst tennis journalist Jon Wertheim claimed that Williams is the toughest player of all time. American tennis player Christina McHale praised her composure in high pressure moments, stating that, for Williams, "being clutch is like breathing", and that she "seems to come through every single time in the most pressure-packed situations". She has been noted for her ability to produce extraordinary comebacks, particularly on the Grand Slam level, winning three Slams after saving match points, a feat achieved more often than by any other player in tennis history. Williams bounced back from a set down to win 37 Grand Slam matches; her ability to come back from set and break deficits in Grand Slam matches was described by John McEnroe as "a gift", and McEnroe declared that she was "the greatest" competitor in the history of women's tennis. She has also been praised for her ability to serve aces at critical moments. As noted by retired player Li Na in 2016, "break point down, [there is an] 80% chance [she] serves an ace".

Owing to her exceptional serve, powerful groundstrokes, technical mastery, aggressive return of serve, athleticism, and mental strength, Williams has been described as one of the most complete players on tour, and one of the greatest players of all time, irrespective of gender. Williams has stated that her favourite surface is clay, as the slow pace and high bounce afforded aids point construction, although she also excels on faster hard and grass courts.

Rivalries

Serena vs. Venus

Williams played older sister Venus in 31 professional matches since 1998. Overall, Serena is 19–12 against her sister. Serena played Venus 15 times in Grand Slam singles and 13 times in other tournaments (including 11 finals). They have met in nine Grand Slam tournament finals, with Serena winning seven times. Beginning with the 2002 French Open, they played each other in four consecutive Grand Slam finals, which was the first time in the Open Era that the same two players had contested four consecutive finals in Grand Slam singles.

Williams vs. Hingis

Williams leads the series 7–6. One of Williams's first rivalries was with Martina Hingis, who turned pro less than one year before her (Hingis in October 1994, Williams in 1995). They first played each other at the 1998 Miami Open where Hingis won in three sets. All but one of their matches was played on a hard court with the exception being a contest on clay in Rome 1999, which Hingis won in straight sets. Their last match took place at the 2002 Miami Open with Williams winning in a loss of just four games. Hingis was forced to briefly retire citing ankle injuries.

Williams vs. Capriati
Williams leads the series against Jennifer Capriati 10–7. Once considered one of the best rivalries in women's tennis, the competition between Williams and Capriati was stiff with 12 out of 17 meetings going three sets. The rivalry, starting in 1999, began one sided with Capriati winning four of their first five matches. Williams would then go on to win the next eight. Williams and Capriati played with similar styles, both known for using their power and athleticism to gain quick advantages in points.

Williams vs. Henin

Williams leads the series 8–6. Justine Henin and Williams met 14 times, five of which were in tournament finals. In majors they have faced each other seven times with Henin leading 4–3. Opposite personalities and styles of play are often cited as what made their rivalry entertaining.

In the semifinals of the 2003 French Open, when at 4–2, 30–0 on Williams's serve in the third set, Henin raised her hand to indicate she was not ready to receive; Williams then put her serve into the net. The umpire did not see Henin raise her hand, and thus did not allow Williams a first serve. Williams lost the game and would go on to lose the match. Their last match took place in the final of the 2010 Australian Open where Williams won in three sets to take her 12th major title.

Williams vs. Azarenka
Williams leads the series 18–5. The rivalry began at the 2008 Australian Open, and their most recent match was in the semifinals of the 2020 US Open. Williams holds a 10–1 record in Grand Slams. Azarenka is the only person to ever win four WTA tour level finals against Williams. While their rivalry is heavily favored towards Williams, their matches are known for their fierce competitiveness, and Azarenka is considered the only player to truly challenge Williams following the retirement of Capriati, Henin, and Hingis, with 9 of their matches extending to three sets.

Williams vs. Sharapova
Williams leads the series 20–2. The pair first met in the fourth round of the 2004 Miami Open, where Williams defeated Sharapova 6–4, 6–3. Their rivalry truly began at the 2004 Wimbledon final, where Williams was the two-time defending champion; Sharapova upset her 6–1, 6–4. Williams next lost to Sharapova in the finals of the 2004 WTA Tour Championships, 6–4, 2–6, 4–6. Since then, however, Williams dominated the rivalry, winning all of their clashes, with only three of their matches going to three sets. They met 10 times in Grand Slam tournaments, where Williams led 9–1, and they further met in 9 finals, with Williams leading 7–2. Sharapova retired in February 2020, with their final match being in the first round of the 2019 US Open; Williams defeated Sharapova 6–1, 6–1 in one hour exactly. Despite the one-sided nature of their rivalry, it is considered one of the most prominent rivalries on the WTA Tour of the 21st century, due to alleged personality clashes, similarly aggressive playing styles, and significant media interest.

Match controversies

Accusations of match fixing
When both of the Williams sisters entered the top ten and started meeting in tournaments, rumors of match fixing started to circulate. John McEnroe, while commenting on the 2000 Wimbledon semifinal between the two sisters, said that "Serena may not be allowed to win. Richard [Williams] may have something to say about this." After losing to Venus at the Indian Wells quarterfinals in 2001, Elena Dementieva asserted during a post-match interview that Richard Williams decided the results of matches between the two sisters. Shortly after that, Venus Williams pulled out of her Indian Wells semifinal match against Serena Williams at the last minute, claiming tendinitis; this occurrence garnered much speculation in the press, and some fans demanded their money back.

Indian Wells boycott
At the 2001 Ericsson Open the following week, Richard Williams stated that racist comments were made to him in the stands, and the tournament director refused to offer Williams an apology for how he was treated. As a result, neither sister played the tournament even though it had become a mandatory stop on the WTA tour since 2009. In 2015, Williams decided to end her 14-year boycott and played.

2004 US Open
In her US Open quarterfinal match against Jennifer Capriati, an incorrect overrule was made by chair umpire Mariana Alves; the video review showed that Williams's shot landed in bounds. In the same match, new technology being tested made incorrect line calls late in the third set. Williams argued with the chair over a couple of calls during the match, but was not successful. Capriati won the match, with Serena herself acknowledging that this was primarily due to her 57 unforced errors; nevertheless, she accused Alves of temporary insanity and said that she "felt cheated." In a post-match interview Capriati sharply observed that bad calls had gone against her in the past as well. Alves did not officiate for the remainder of the tournament; this was not punitive, as commonly thought, as she was not scheduled to officiate. The controversy renewed calls for, and was widely given credit for, the adoption of technology such as the MacCAM and Hawk-Eye systems.

2009 US Open
In the US Open semifinal round against Kim Clijsters, Williams slammed her racket on the court after losing the first set. She was given a warning, with a potential second violation carrying a one-point penalty. While trailing 4–6, 5–6, 15–30, Williams's second serve was called a foot fault, resulting in two match points for Clijsters. Williams gestured with her racket to the lineswoman who had made the call and yelled at her, with profanities and a threat to shove a tennis ball down the lineswoman's throat. During the subsequent on-court conference between the chair umpire, the lineswoman, US Open officials, and Williams, a television microphone picked up Williams saying to the lineswoman, "I didn't say I would kill you! Are you serious?" The incident resulted in Williams being penalized a point for unsportsmanlike conductnecessitated by the earlier warning for racket abusemeaning Clijsters won the match 64, 75. The following day, Williams was issued the maximum permissible on-site fine of $10,000 (plus $500 for racket abuse). After further investigation, the Grand Slam Committee in November 2009 fined her $175,000 in place of suspending her from the 2010 US Open or other Grand Slam events. They also placed her on a two-year probation which provided that if Williams committed another offense at a Grand Slam event in the next two years, she would be suspended from participating in the following US Open. If, however, she committed no offenses within the next two years, her fine would be reduced to $82,500. Williams initially refused to apologize for her outburst, both in her post-match press conference and in an official statement released the following day. She eventually did apologize, stating "I just really wanted to apologize sincerely because I'm a very prideful person, and I'm a very intense person and a very emotional person", and "I wanted to offer my sincere apologies to anyone that I may have offended." She said she was humbled by the experience.

2011 US Open
In the final of the 2011 US Open against Samantha Stosur, Williams shouted "Come on!" as the Australian attempted to return a forehand Williams believed to be a winner. The chair umpire Eva Asderaki awarded the point to Stosur based on the ITF's deliberate hindrance rule, which states, "If a player commits any act which hinders his opponent in making a stroke, then, if this is deliberate, he shall lose the point or if involuntary, the point shall be replayed." As the point was 30–40 on Williams's serve, the penalty gave the break of serve to Stosur. Williams became angry with the chair umpire and made several gestures and unflattering comments toward her during the next changeover, including telling Asderaki that if the umpire ever saw Serena coming toward her, she should "look the other way". Williams initially gained momentum in the set following the penalty, breaking back in the next game, but eventually flagged and lost the match, 2–6, 3–6. At the end of the match, she declined to offer the customary handshake to Asderaki. Williams mentioned the incident in her post-match speech as the tournament runner-up, asserting, "I hit a winner, but I guess it didn't count", but added, "It wouldn't have mattered in the end. Sam played well." A writer for ESPN suggested that Williams could avoid being found to have violated the terms of the "probation" on which she was placed following her 2009 outburst, as she did not appear to have used profanity in addressing Asderaki during the match. In the end, Williams was fined $2,000 and was not barred from competing in the 2012 US Open because "Williams's conduct, while verbally abusive, [did] not rise to the level of a major offence under the Grand Slam code of conduct."

2018 US Open
Williams's 2018 US Open ended in controversy with Williams falling to Naomi Osaka in straight sets following a game penalty in the second set of the final. During that second set, she was given a code violation because her coach, Patrick Mouratoglou, gave her coaching hand signals. Williams was upset by the violation, claiming that her coach was simply giving her a thumbs up, and demanded an apology from chair umpire Carlos Ramos. Mouratoglou later admitted that he was coaching. She received a second violation for smashing her racket on the court, which resulted in a point penalty. After her third code violation for verbal abuse against the umpire, Williams was assessed a game penalty. Williams said that she believed she was treated unfairly by the umpire because she is a woman. Williams was fined a total of $17,000 including $4,000 for a coaching violation, $3,000 for racket abuse and $10,000 for verbal abuse towards the umpire.

Other issues 

In the beginning years of Williams's professional career, hair beads donned by the Williams sisters were the focus of discussion by commentators such as Chris Evert and John McEnroe, with Mary Carillo characterizing their hair as "noisy and disruptive." The beads often broke and scattered across the court. Scholar Nancy E. Spencer said that commentary that dismissed the Williams' cultural hairstyles served to "other" the sisters, particularly in the context of a white dominated sport where their appearance and specifically their physicality is a popular topic for discussion.

Following the match controversy at the 2018 US Open final between Williams and Naomi Osaka, the Melbourne newspaper the Herald Sun published a cartoon by Mark Knight depicting Williams having a tantrum and breaking her racket while the umpire asks her opponent to "just let her win." The cartoon was widely criticized as racist and sexist, including by Williams's husband, Reddit co-founder Alexis Ohanian, and author J. K. Rowling. Complaints centered around the portrayal of Williams as an angry black woman with exaggerated large lips, a broad flat nose, and positioned in an ape-like pose, and the portrayal of Williams's opponent, Osaka, who is half-Japanese, half-Haitian, with blonde hair. At least some of these criticisms were inaccurate; video and photos from the 2018 US Open women's final show that Osaka's naturally dark hair was in fact dyed blonde at that time. The editor of the Herald Sun argued the cartoon was unfairly criticized on social media. Knight defended his work, saying that his satire was never about race or gender, but was about putting a spotlight on bad behaviour by sporting superstars. In the immediate aftermath of the controversy he suspended his Twitter account to "protect his family and friends."

In September 2019, Romanian television host Radu Banciu made the following comments during a live broadcast: "Serena Williams looks exactly like one of those monkeys at the zoo with the red asses." Romania's National Council for Combating Discrimination fined Banciu approximately $1,875 for his comments.

Legacy 
Williams is considered one of the best female tennis players of all time. In 2017, BBC Sport users picked Williams as the greatest female tennis player of the Open Era. BBC presenter and former French Open Champion, Sue Barker, said "Serena is the greatest because this era is so much more competitive than previous eras. The pace she generates – her serve is without question the greatest ever – combined with her movement and her power, she pushes her opponents constantly on the back foot". In 2018, a Tennis.com panel selected Serena as the greatest female tennis player in the Open Era. Some commentators, players and sports writers regard Williams as the greatest woman tennis player of all time. In 2018, Federer said the player who probably had the best case for tennis "Greatest Of All Time", man or woman, was Serena Williams. In 2020, the Tennis Channel ranked Williams as the greatest woman tennis player of all time. In 2022, John McEnroe described Williams as an "icon" and the "GOAT of GOATs".

Alongside her sister Venus, Williams has been widely credited with increasing diversity within the sport:It all starts with Venus and Serena. The demonstration effect. The power of seeing two African-American girls with braids in the finals of the biggest tournaments in the world in a predominantly white sport. Just a huge impact that really can't be overstated. That attracted thousands of girls into the sport, not just African-American but all backgrounds and races.

— Martin Blackman, General Manager of Player Development, United States Tennis AssociationFormer U.S. Open champion Sloane Stephens, French Open finalist Coco Gauff and four-time Grand Slam champion Naomi Osaka, have thanked Williams, saying that they never would've picked up a racket, if it was not for her.

For their first match of March 2019, the women of the United States women's national soccer team each wore a jersey with the name of a woman they were honoring on the back; Crystal Dunn chose the name of Serena Williams.

In December 2019, The Associated Press named Williams Female Athlete of the Decade for the 2010s. 

In September 2022, Twitter said that Williams was the most tweeted about female athlete ever.

Personal life

Williams is married to Reddit co-founder Alexis Ohanian. He proposed to her on December 10, 2016, in Rome. On December 30, 2016, Williams announced their engagement in a Reddit post. They married on November 16, 2017, in New Orleans. Guests at the wedding included Beyoncé, Anna Wintour, Kelly Rowland and Kim Kardashian. She planned to move to San Francisco with Ohanian after the wedding.

On April 19, 2017, Williams posted a sideways picture of herself on Snapchat that focused on her midsection; it had the caption, "20 weeks", prompting speculation that she was pregnant. Later that evening, her spokesperson confirmed the pregnancy. The fact that she was 20 weeks pregnant when announcing her pregnancy meant that she was eight weeks pregnant when she won the Australian Open earlier that year. Williams later said that posting the picture on Snapchat was an accident, and that she had intended to save the photo for her records.

In September 2017, Williams gave birth to her daughter. She had an emergency caesarean-section delivery due to the baby's heart rate dropping during labor and was at first devastated about it. She suffered a pulmonary embolism after giving birth, leaving her bedridden for six weeks and delaying her return to training. (This encounter was not her first with the disease venous thromboembolism; she had been hospitalized in 2011 for pulmonary embolism thought to have originated from a deep vein thrombosis.) In August 2018, she revealed she was suffering from postpartum depression. Williams gave her daughter a doll, Qai Qai, that has become famous on social media. She has also faced many questions whether she would raise her daughter to play tennis to which she answered saying she has already hired a coach for her daughter. She also posts many pictures of her and her daughter on the tennis court with rackets.

Williams was raised one of Jehovah's Witness, but states she has "never really practiced it". She often thanks Jehovah after winning matches. Williams confirmed that she follows some practices: "(she) doesn't celebrate birthdays. We're Jehovah's Witnesses, so we don't do that." In January 2023, about half a year after her retirement, she got baptised as one of Jehovah's Witnesses in Florida.

Williams' current agent is former player Jill Smoller.

Off-court activities

Equipment and endorsements
In the early 2000s, Williams wore Puma apparel and footwear on court. Williams signed a five-year endorsement deal with Nike in 2004 for $40 million, and has been endorsed by the company for clothing, apparel, and footwear ever since. Nike designs custom clothing for Williams, which she wears on the court along with custom footwear. The largest building on Nike's Portland campus is the one million square foot Serena Williams Building which features many references to the athlete's career and her long collaboration with Nike. According to John Hoke, Nike's Chief Design Officer, Williams made an important contribution to the creative process of the design of the building.

She used the Wilson Hammer Stretch range of racquets when she won her first Grand Slam title in 1999, before switching to the Hyper Hammer range. She switched to the Wilson nCode briefly in 2005, and used various iterations of the Wilson Blade racquet since 2008. Her racquet is typically oversized, with a head size of 104 square inches. Since 2017, Wilson has manufactured a signature racquet, the Wilson Blade SW104, which is designed to Williams's specifications. Since 2020, Williams used a smaller variant of this racquet, the Wilson Blade SW102 Autograph.

Williams also has endorsement deals with AbbVie, Anheuser-Busch InBev, Aston Martin, AT&T, Audemars Piguet, Beats by Dre, Berlei Bras, Block Inc, Bumble, Chase Bank, Delta Air Lines, DirecTV, DoorDash, Ford Motor, Gatorade, Gucci, Hanes, IBM, Intel, Mission Athletecare, OnePiece, OPI Products, Pepsi, Subway,Tempur, Tonal and the Walt Disney Company.

In 2015, Williams became the CSO (Chief Sporting Officer) for British luxury automobile manufacturer Aston Martin. She then posted her first experience on social media service Twitter, and said: "I'm loving my first day on the job as Chief Sporting Officer and Director of Fun!", stating her optimism on the job as the CSO.

Williams is also on the board of directors at SurveyMonkey.

Fashion
Williams has been noted for her unusual and colorful outfits on court. In 2002, there was much talk when she wore a black lycra catsuit at the US Open. At the 2004 US Open, Williams wore denim skirts and knee-high boots—tournament officials did not allow her to wear the boots during matches. At the 2008 Wimbledon, the white trench coat she wore during warm-up for her opening match was the subject of much discussion since it was worn despite sunny weather. Some social scientists have argued that the most negative reactions to Williams's on-court fashion statements, especially in newspaper coverage of the Australian Open and Wimbledon, combines with writers' fixation upon her muscular body to distract from her on-court accomplishments and fit this commentary within centuries-old narratives of the "pornographic eroticism" and "sexual grotesquerie" of African and African-American women.

Williams formerly had a special line with Puma. In April 2004, she signed a deal worth US$40million for a line with Nike. Since 2004, she has also run her own line of designer apparel, "Aneres"—her first name spelled backward. In 2009, she launched a signature collection of handbags and jewelry. The collection, Signature Statement, is sold mainly on the Home Shopping Network (HSN).

In early 2010, Williams became a certified nail technician in preparation for her upcoming nail collection with a company called HairTech. In 2015, she became the first black female athlete to have a picture by herself on the cover of Vogue, which she did for the April 2015 issue. In 2015, she also presented her HSN Signature Statement collection for the second time at the New York Fashion Week Showa clothing line exclusively made for the retailer HSN.

In May 2018, she wore a skin-tight catsuit at the 2018 French Open that likened a superhero outfit and helped promote her new clothing line, Serena. The outfit was subsequently banned by the French Tennis Federation president Bernard Giudicelli, with the explanation: "It will no longer be accepted. One must respect the game and the place." Williams then wore a black tutu to her first match at the 2018 US Open on August 27, 2018, against Magda Linette which she dominated in straight sets. In February 2019, Serena Williams was appointed to the board of directors of online fashion marketplace Poshmark.

In Fall 2019, Williams launched the first collection of her sustainable clothing line, S by Serena. Inspired by 1990s street wear, S by Serena collections are shown on a range of body types and sizes (ranging from XS to 3X), highlighting the line's focus on inclusivity.

Activism
Williams became more involved in social change as her career progressed, primarily using social media as a medium of expressing her views. In 2016 she posted her support of Black Lives Matter on her Facebook page, voicing her concern about her young nephew being in danger from police officers owing to his skin color. During American tennis player Tennys Sandgren's breakthrough run to the quarterfinals of the 2018 Australian Open, it was revealed that he tweeted insensitive words about the LGBT community, followed members of the alt-right, and referred to an article describing Williams's on-court behavior as "disgusting". Williams responded by tweeting her displeasure, saying, "@TennysSandgren I don't need or want one. But there is an entire group of people that deserves an apology. I can't look at my daughter and tell her I sat back and was quiet. No! She will know how to stand up for herself and others – through my example." Additionally, she attached an image that read, "Maturity is being able to apologize and admit when you're wrong because you know that your mistakes don't define you".

Also in 2016, Serena Williams wrote an open letter in Porter Magazine's "Incredible Women of 2016" to speak out about gender equality and her personal struggles as a woman in tennis. She noted that women's contributions to the sport of tennis are not recognized in the way men's contributions are recognized; she also called out issues of equal pay in tennis. She ended the letter stating that she hoped that her letter would inspire a new generation of women to "push for greatness and follow their dreams with steadfast resilience."

Williams received several awards for her activism, namely those directed towards Black communities. She was listed among the 35 "most remarkable and beautiful black women" in the world by Essence magazine. The NAACP honored Williams with the President's Award at the annual NAACP Image Awards.

Williams, in 2014, founded the equity company "Serena Ventures." The firm's goal is to help start-up companies whose perspectives and innovations level the playing field for women and people of color.

Entertainment
Williams has appeared on television and also provided voice work on animated shows: in a 2001 episode of The Simpsons Serena joined the animation along with sister Venus, Pete Sampras and Andre Agassi. She has also provided guest voice work in a 2005 episode of Playhouse Disney's animated kids show Higglytown Heroes and a 2007 episode of the Nickelodeon cartoon Avatar: The Last Airbender, which she has described as her "favorite show".

Williams posed for the 2003 and 2004 editions of the Sports Illustrated Swimsuit Issue. In April 2005, MTV announced plans to broadcast a reality show around the lives of Serena and Venus, which was eventually aired on ABC Family. Williams has appeared twice on MTV's Punk'd and in 2007, appeared in the ABC reality television series Fast Cars and Superstars: The Gillette Young Guns Celebrity Race. In 2002, she played Miss Wiggins in the season 3 episode "Crouching Mother, Hidden Father" of My Wife and Kids; she has also guest-starred in episodes of The Bernie Mac Show, ER and Law & Order: Special Victims Unit. In 2007, Williams appeared in the music video of "I Want You" by the American rapper Common, alongside performers Alicia Keys and Kanye West.

In late 2009, Williams became the first active female professional athlete to appear in a feminine hygiene product advertising campaign. A series of online videos and print advertisements for Tampax Pearl tampons showed her hitting balls at Mother Nature, played by Catherine Lloyd Burns, to prevent Mother Nature giving her a red-wrapped gift, representing her menstrual period. In the online videos, the two have dueling press conferences over the "bad blood" between them. "A lot of celebrities are not open to working with our brand, and we're thrilled that Serena is", said a brand manager for Tampax at Procter & Gamble.

In July 2012, she appeared on ABC's comedic improv TV series Trust Us with Your Life and as a lawyer on Lifetime's television series Drop Dead Diva.

To celebrate the 35th anniversary of Pac-Man, Williams made a cameo appearance in the film Pixels, which starred Adam Sandler and Kevin James, and premiered on July 24, 2015.

Williams is known to be close to Beyoncé and made a cameo appearance dancing in Beyoncé's music video for the song Sorry in the hit album Lemonade. Williams said the director told her, "We would love for you to be in this particular song. It's about strength and it's about courage and that's what we see you as."

In 2021, Williams signed a first-look deal with Amazon Studios. She makes a cameo appearance as himself in the 2022 Netflix film Glass Onion: A Knives Out Mystery.

Language fluency
In addition to English as her native language, Williams also speaks conversational French and knows some Spanish and Italian. At the 2013, 2015, 2016 and 2018 French Open she gave her on-court interviews in French much to the crowd's delight.

Miami Dolphins venture
In August 2009, Williams and her sister Venus became minority owners of the Miami Dolphins after purchasing a small stake in the team. They live near each other in Palm Beach Gardens, Florida, which is about an hour's drive from the Dolphins' stadium. They are the first black women to hold any amount of ownership in an NFL franchise.

Charity work
In 2004 and 2005, Serena and her sister, Venus, visited hospitals and played several tennis matches in predominantly black cities to raise money for the local Ronald McDonald House charities. An ESPN episode was dedicated to the Williams sisters' charity tour.
In 2008, as part of the Serena Williams Foundation's work, Williams helped to fund the construction of the Serena Williams Secondary School in Matooni, Kenya. The Serena Williams Foundation also provides university scholarships for underprivileged students in the United States. In 2016, the Serena Williams Fund partnered with Helping Hands Jamaica to build the Salt Marsh Primary School for Jamaican youth in Trelawny Parish. She received a Celebrity Role Model Award from Avon Foundation in 2003 for work in breast cancer. Williams has also been involved in a number of clinics at schools and community centers, particularly those which have programs focusing on at-risk youth. She has also won the "Young Heroes Award" from Big Brothers Big Sisters of Greater L.A. and Inland (2003) and the "Family Circle and Prudential Financial Player Who Makes a Difference Award" (2004). In response to the 2010 Haiti earthquake, Williams, along with other ATP and WTA stars, decided to forgo their final day of preparation for the 2010 Australian Open to form a charity event in which all proceeds would go to the Haiti earthquake victims. Serena, along with her sister Venus, is a supporter and contributor of First Serve Miami, a foundation for youth who want to learn tennis but are socially and economically challenged. She has been an International Goodwill Ambassador with UNICEF since 2011 and has helped launch UNICEF's Schools for Asia campaign.

In addition to the Serena Williams Fund in 2016, Serena and Venus collaborated on the Williams Sisters Fund to work on philanthropic projects together. Also in 2016, in their childhood home of Compton, California Serena and Venus teamed up to found the Yetunde Price Resource Center, in honor of their late sister. The Resource Center provides services to families affected by community violence.

Williams's return to Indian Wells in 2015 was done in partnership with the Equal Justice Initiative, a non-profit organization that provides legal representation to those who might have been denied a fair trial. EJI executive director Bryan Stevenson lauded her courage in supporting his organization. "It's so rare when athletes at the top of their game are willing to embrace a set of issues that, for a lot of people, are edgier", he said. "This is not aid to orphans. ... She was standing when a lot of her contemporaries remain seated, speaking up when others are being quiet."

In 2014, Williams began hosting an annual charity run named "The Serena Williams Ultimate Fun Run". The event is in support of the Serena Williams Fund, which helps underprivileged individuals and communities that are affected by senseless violence and to ensure equal access to education of youth.

In 2017, Williams became Ambassador for the Allstate Foundation's Purple Purse project, an initiative to provide financial empowerment to domestic abuse victims. In a press release, Vicky Dinges, Allstate's senior vice president of corporate responsibility, said, "we are thrilled to welcome Serena, a longtime advocate and role model for so many, to the Purple Purse family. Her voice will bring new audiences into this critical conversation."

Other charitable organizations Williams supports include the Elton John AIDS Foundation, Great Ormond Street Hospital, Hearts of Gold, the Common Ground Foundation, the Small Steps Project, the HollyRod Foundation, Beyond the Boroughs National Scholarship Fund, World Education, the Eva Longoria Foundation, the Caliber Foundation and the Cure for MND Foundation.

Writing
The Williams sisters, with author Hilary Beard, wrote a book titled Venus & Serena: Serving From The Hip: 10 Rules For Living, Loving and Winning, which was published in 2005. During the 2009 Wimbledon Championships, Williams said that she was in the process of writing a TV show storyline, which would be converted into script form by her agency. She stated that the show would represent subject matter from a mix of popular American television shows such as Desperate Housewives and Family Guy.
Williams released her first solo autobiography, entitled On the Line, following the 2009 US Open.

Soccer
On July 21, 2020, Williams was announced as part of a nearly all-women investors' group that was awarded a new franchise in the National Women's Soccer League, the top level of the women's sport in the U.S. The new team began play in 2022 as Angel City FC. Her husband Alexis Ohanian is classified as the "lead investor", but he holds a minority interest, and is the only male in the ownership group. Other announced owners include several prominent actresses and media figures, two businesswomen, 14 former members of the U.S. women's national team, and her daughter.

Career statistics

Grand Slam tournament performance timeline

Current through the 2022 US Open.

Note: Williams withdrew from the 2018 French Open before her fourth round match and the 2020 French Open before her second round match, both of which do not officially count as losses.

Grand Slam tournament finals

Singles: 33 (23–10)

Women's doubles: 14 (14–0)

Mixed doubles: 4 (2–2)

Records

 Records in bold indicate peer-less achievements.
 Records in italics are currently active streaks.

Filmography
Williams as a child, her early training, and relationship to her sister Venus and family are depicted in the 2021 feature movie King Richard, which focuses especially on Venus's teenage transition into a professional tennis player.

See also

WTA Tour records
Grand Slam (tennis)
List of WTA number 1 ranked singles tennis players
List of WTA number 1 ranked doubles tennis players
List of highest ranked tennis players per country
List of female tennis players
List of tennis tournaments
List of tennis rivalries
Tennis records of the Open Era – Women's singles
All-time tennis records – women's singles
Williams sisters rivalry
List of Grand Slam women's singles champions
List of Grand Slam women's doubles champions
List of Grand Slam mixed doubles champions
Women's sports

References

Bibliography

External links

 
 
 
 
 
 Serena Williams  video produced by Makers: Women Who Make America

 
1981 births
Living people
20th-century African-American people
21st-century African-American people 
African-American designers
African-American female tennis players
American autobiographers
American female tennis players
American Jehovah's Witnesses
Australian Open (tennis) champions
American women ambassadors
Angel City FC owners
French Open champions
Grand Slam (tennis) champions in mixed doubles
Grand Slam (tennis) champions in women's doubles
Grand Slam (tennis) champions in women's singles
Hopman Cup competitors
Laureus World Sports Awards winners
Medalists at the 2000 Summer Olympics
Medalists at the 2008 Summer Olympics
Medalists at the 2012 Summer Olympics
Olympic gold medalists for the United States in tennis
Olympic tennis players of the United States
People from Palm Beach Gardens, Florida
Shorty Award winners
Sports world record holders
Sportspeople from Compton, California
Sportspeople from Saginaw, Michigan
Sportspeople from West Palm Beach, Florida
Tennis people from California
Tennis people from Florida
Tennis people from Michigan
Tennis players at the 2000 Summer Olympics
Tennis players at the 2008 Summer Olympics
Tennis players at the 2012 Summer Olympics
Tennis players at the 2016 Summer Olympics
UNICEF Goodwill Ambassadors
Isenberg School of Management alumni
University of Massachusetts Amherst alumni
US Open (tennis) champions
Wimbledon champions
Women autobiographers
20th-century African-American women
Williams family (tennis)
WTA number 1 ranked singles tennis players
WTA number 1 ranked doubles tennis players
ITF World Champions